Fridolin Kristof Yoku (born 10 February 1997) is an Indonesian professional footballer who plays as a midfielder for Liga 1 club Persipura Jayapura.

Club career

Semen Padang
In 2017, Yoku signed a year contract with Liga 1 club Semen Padang. He made his league debut on 4 May 2017 in a match against Bali United at the Kapten I Wayan Dipta Stadium, Gianyar.

Persipura Jayapura
He was signed for Persipura Jayapura to play in Liga 1 in the 2020 season. Yoku made his league debut on 13 March 2020 in a match against Persebaya Surabaya at the Gelora Bung Tomo Stadium, Surabaya. This season was suspended on 27 March 2020 due to the COVID-19 pandemic. The season was abandoned and was declared void on 20 January 2021.

Career statistics

Club

Honours

Club 
Semen Padang
 Liga 2 runner-up: 2018

References

External links 
Fridolin Yoku at Soccerway
Fridolin Yoku at Liga Indonesia

1997 births
Living people
Indonesian footballers
Association football midfielders
Semen Padang F.C. players
Persipura Jayapura players
Liga 1 (Indonesia) players
Papuan sportspeople
People from Jayapura
Sportspeople from Papua